(1927–2003) was a Japanese political scientist and intellectual historian, a "leading intellectual of 'postwar Japan'"  and a follower of Masao Maruyama.

References

1927 births
2003 deaths